Wendy Ramón Cruz Martínez (born 7 March 1976 in Santiago de los Caballeros) is a professional male cyclist from the Dominican Republic. Nicknamed El Ciclon he won the gold medal in the men's individual road race at the 2007 Pan American Games.

References

 

1976 births
Living people
Doping cases in cycling
Dominican Republic sportspeople in doping cases
Dominican Republic male cyclists
Cyclists at the 1999 Pan American Games
Cyclists at the 2007 Pan American Games
Cyclists at the 2011 Pan American Games
People from Santiago de los Caballeros
Pan American Games gold medalists for the Dominican Republic
Pan American Games medalists in cycling
Central American and Caribbean Games bronze medalists for the Dominican Republic
Competitors at the 2006 Central American and Caribbean Games
Central American and Caribbean Games medalists in cycling
Medalists at the 2007 Pan American Games